Aristonectinae is a clade of plesiosaurs in the family Elasmosauridae. It includes the Late Cretaceous plesiosaurs Aristonectes and Kaiwhekea, traditionally grouped with the Late Jurassic Tatenectes and Kimmerosaurus in the family Aristonectidae.

References

Late Cretaceous plesiosaurs